KF Deçani is a professional football club from Kosovo which competes in the Third League (Group A). The club is based in Deçan. Their home ground is the Deçan Sports Field which has a viewing capacity of 500.

See also
 List of football clubs in Kosovo

References

Football clubs in Kosovo
Association football clubs established in 1949

lt:KF Deçani